Glinsk is a townland in the County Mayo Gaeltacht in Ireland. It is in the parish of Kilcommon and barony of Erris. Glinsk Mountain (304 metres) is a remote area of upland blanket bog with sea cliffs descending to Broadhaven Bay and continuing along the coast to a height of 255 metres at Benwee Head. The mountain is the source of the Muingnabo River.

History and geography
Due to particularly ancient blanket bog deposits, believed to predate the Neolithic period, bog filled lakes and conifer forestry plantations in the area surrounding Glinsk, the population is extremely low with no houses in this townland and few within several surrounding kilometres.

The only obvious remains of human habitation in the area is the ruin of a British lookout tower built in 1806 high up on the southern side of Glinsk mountain.  The English, having been taken by surprise when the French landed at Killala during the Irish Rebellion of 1798, were determined that it should not happen again.  They built watch towers along the coast, each of which could be seen from those on either side of it. The one built on the southern slopes of Glinsk is situated 283 metres above sea level.  The ruin, some two metres in height, can still be seen.

Natural energy project proposal 
There is a proposal to build a 480 megawatt combined wind farm-hydroelectric facility at this location which could contribute towards the county's goal of becoming self-sufficient in energy supply. The project would use wind turbines to pump sea water up to energy storage in the form of reservoirs on Glinsk Mountain. When required, the reservoirs would feed power generating turbines by allowing the water to fall down a shaft back to the ocean.

Pictures

References 

 Noone, Fr. S. Where the Sun Sets (1991) Kildare p. 175

Bogs of Ireland
Townlands of County Mayo
Erris
Gaeltacht places in County Mayo